The U Street–Garfield Line, designated Routes 90 and 92, are daily bus routes operated by the Washington Metropolitan Area Transit Authority between Anacostia station (90) or Congress Heights station (92) of the Green Line of the Washington Metro and Duke Ellington Bridge (90) in Adams Morgan or U Street station (92) of the Green and Yellow Lines of the Washington Metro. The lines operate every 12 - 24 minutes between 7 AM and 9 PM, and 15 - 30 minutes at all other times. Route 90 and 92 trips are roughly 60 to 70 minutes.

Background
Routes 90 and 92 operate daily between Anacostia station (90) or Congress Heights station (92) and Duke Ellington Bridge (90) or U Street station (92). Route 90 operates along Howard Road and Martin Luther King Jr Avenue. Route 92 operates along Alabama Avenue, Naylor Road and Good Hope Road before reaching Martin Luther King Jr Avenue. Both lines merge on the intersection of Martin Luther King Jr Avenue and Good Hope Road and operate along M Street, 8th Street, Florida Avenue, and U Street. The 92 terminates at U Street station while the 90 continues along U Street, 18th Street, and Calvert Street before terminating at Duke Ellington Bridge. The line is the 4th busiest Metrobus line in the system as of 2016 averaging almost 12,000 riders.

Additional route 90 trips operate on school days from KIPP DC College Prep to Anacostia station leaving at 4:10 pm. Those trips operate along Brentwood Parkway, Mount Olivet Road, Montello Avenue, and K Street before resuming its regular route along 8th Street going to Anacostia.

Additional weekday peak-hour route 92 trips operate between Congress Heights and Eastern Market station only in order to reduce crowding.

Routes 90 and 92 currently operate out of Shepherd Parkway garage.

Route 90 stops

Route 92 stops

History
The U Street–Garfield Line originally operated under the Capital Traction Company which operated under streetcars in the late 1800s. Route 92 operated under the Good Hope Line while 90 operated on a combination of the New Jersey Avenue, U Street, and Florida Avenue/8th Street lines. Both route 90 and 92 operated between Southeast DC and Duke Ellington Bridge via the Calvert Street Loop, Barney Circle, and Washington Union Station mainly along 8th Street, Florida Avenue, and U Street. The line would later be extended to McLean Gardens. The U Street portion would be electrified in 1892 while the Florida Avenue/8th Street portion would be electrified in 1908.

Eventually, the Good Hope Line was converted into buses on January 26, 1925 while route 90 remained operating under streetcars when the Capital Traction Company and Washington Railway & Electric Company merged and formed the Capital Transit Company. Later routes 90 and 92 were acquired by DC Transit in 1956 and converted into buses on January 28, 1962 when streetcars were shut down. Routes 90 and 92 would be acquired by WMATA on January 4, 1973.

In later years, new routes 91 and 93 were introduced as the Garfield-Owl Line to provide late night service to routes 90 and 92 from 
On December 28, 1991 when Anacostia station opened, route 90 was rerouted to operate to the new station while also replacing the Stanton Road Line (94) portion between Anacostia and McLean Gardens when route 94 was shorten to terminate at Anacostia station.

On December 29, 1996, short route 90 trip operating between Duke Ellington Bridge and McLean Gardens during early morning and late night hours, was replaced during the weekdays, Saturdays, and Sundays by an equal number of route 93 trips which will be extended from Duke Ellington Bridge to McLean Gardens over the same routing.

On January 13, 2001, route 92 was extended from its Garfield terminus to the newly opened Congress Heights station replacing all route 91 service. Loop service via 15th and Congress Place, SE, was also discontinued. Route 93 was also shifted to the U Street–Garfield Line and being extended from Shipley Terrace to Congress Heights station alongside the 92. Service was be discontinued south of Alabama Avenue (Trenton Place, 19th Street and Savannah Street).

On June 24, 2007. routes 90, 92, and 93 were shorten from McLean Gardens to Duke Ellington Bridge in order to improve on time efficiency from the long routes the buses run along. Select rush hour buses would still end at 14th and U streets, NW however. Route 96 would replace the 90, 92, and 93 portion between McLean Gardens and Duke Ellington Bridge.

Between 2010 and 2011, WMATA and the District Department of Transportation began a study on the U Street–Garfield Line. Public meetings and surveys were contributed to passengers on how to improve the lines. Multiple passengers complained about the route being crowded, loud buses, buses behind schedule, low frequency, safety and security, shelters and stops, communication, and extending the western end of line up to Woodley Park station or McLean Gardens again.

At the time of the study, routes 90, 92, and 93 were operating out of Southern Avenue division which utilizes Flxibles, D40LFRs, DE40LFAs, and Orion Vs. 

On June 22, 2014, all route 92 trips were shorten from  Duke Ellington Bridge to U and 14th Streets, NW terminus (U Street station) and all Route 92 southbound service begins at U & 13th Streets, NW (U Street station, 13th Street NW entrance). Service between U Street station and Duke Ellington Bridge is still provided by routes 90 and 93.

In 2015, WMATA proposed to eliminate all route 93 service due to low ridership along Stanton, Pomeroy, and Morris Roads and to simplify the line. Alternative service is provided by routes 90, 92, and 94.

On March 27, 2016, all route 93 service was discontinued and replaced by routes 90, 92, and 94 running on the same routing. Additional early morning and late evening 90 and 92 trips were added.

On June 24, 2018, additional route 92 trips were added to operate between Congress Heights station and Eastern Market station.

During the COVID-19 pandemic, routes 90 and 92 were reduced to operate on its Saturday supplemental schedule beginning on March 16, 2020. However beginning on March 18, 2020, the line was further reduced to operate on its Sunday schedule. On March 21, 2020, all route 92 weekend service was suspended and route 90 was relegated to operate every 30 minutes. Route 92 weekend service and all full service was restored on August 23, 2020.

In 2020, WMATA proposed to eliminate the 92 short trips between Congress Heights and Eastern Market stations as there is alternative service on each stop and at the request of the District Department of Transportation.

Incidents
 On August 30, 2017, a woman attempted to abduct a seven-year-old boy who was riding to school on board a route 92 bus near 8th and H streets. The suspect would flee the scene after other passengers stopped her. The woman, later identified as Thalia Denise Brown was later arrested on September 14, 2017.
 On October 5, 2018, a route 92 bus and van collided with each other along 22nd Street and Alabama Avenue sending 9 people to the hospital.

References

Street railways in Washington, D.C.
90